The 2019–20 Charlotte Hornets season was the 30th season of the franchise in the National Basketball Association (NBA). This was the first time since 2010 (as the Charlotte Bobcats) without Kemba Walker, as he joined the Boston Celtics prior to the 2019–20 NBA season.

The season was suspended by the league officials following the games of March 11 after it was reported that Rudy Gobert tested positive for COVID-19. On June 4, 2020, the season came to an end for the Hornets when the NBA Board of Governors approved a plan that would restart the season with 22 teams returning to play in the NBA Bubble on July 31, 2020, which was approved by the National Basketball Players Association the next day.

NBA draft

The Hornets hold a lottery selection pick and three second round draft picks before entering the draft. The third second round pick would be then moved to multiple trades before moving to the Miami Heat.

Roster

Standings

Game log

Preseason

|- style="background:#fcc"
| 1
| October 6
| @ Boston
| 
| P. J. Washington (16)
| Miles Bridges (10)
| Terry Rozier (9)
| TD Garden18,624
| 0–1
|- style="background:#fcc"
| 2
| October 9
| Miami
| 
| Terry Rozier (18)
| Zeller, Bridges, Graham (6)
| Josh Perkins (4)
| Spectrum Center8,522
| 0–2
|- style="background:#fcc;"
| 3
| October 11
| Philadelphia
| 
| Dwayne Bacon (17)
| Kidd-Gilchrist, Bridges (7)
| Devonte' Graham (5)
| Lawrence Joel Coliseum10,437
| 0–3
|- style="background:#cfc;"
| 4
| October 14
| @ Memphis
| 
| Terry Rozier (24)
| Cody Zeller (10)
| Terry Rozier (8)
| FedEx Forum11,292
| 1–3
|- style="background:#fcc;"
| 5
| October 16
| Detroit
| 
| Malik Monk (18)
| Cody Zeller (9)
| Malik Monk (7)
| Spectrum Center7,749
| 1–4

Regular season

|- style="background:#cfc;"
| 1
| October 23
| Chicago
| 
| P. J. Washington (27)
| Cody Zeller (12)
| Devonte' Graham (8)
| Spectrum Center19,077
| 1–0
|- style="background:#fcc;"
| 2
| October 25
| Minnesota
| 
| Devonte' Graham (24)
| P. J. Washington (10)
| Terry Rozier (10)
| Spectrum Center14,879
| 1–1
|- style="background:#fcc;"
| 3
| October 27
| @ L. A. Lakers
| 
| Miles Bridges (23)
| Cody Zeller (14)
| Devonte' Graham (5)
| Staples Center18,997
| 1–2
|- style="background:#fcc;"
| 4
| October 28
| @ L. A. Clippers
| 
| Terry Rozier (17)
| Cody Zeller (14)
| Devonte' Graham (12)
| Staples Center19,068
| 1–3
|- style="background:#cfc;"
| 5
| October 30
| @ Sacramento
| 
| P. J. Washington (23)
| Cody Zeller (15)
| Devonte' Graham (9)
| Golden 1 Center15,416
| 2–3

|- style="background:#cfc;"
| 6
| November 2
| @ Golden State
| 
| Dwayne Bacon (25)
| Bridges, Graham, Zeller (8)
| Terry Rozier (7)
| Chase Center18,064
| 3–3
|- style="background:#cfc;"
| 7
| November 5
| Indiana
| 
| Devonte' Graham (35)
| Cody Martin (11)
| Devonte' Graham (6)
| Spectrum Center13,341
| 4–3
|- style="background:#fcc;"
| 8
| November 7
| Boston
| 
| Miles Bridges (18)
| Bridges, Zeller (10)
| Devonte' Graham (9)
| Spectrum Center18,487
| 4–4
|- style="background:#fcc;"
| 9
| November 9
| New Orleans
| 
| Devonte' Graham (24)
| Bridges, Zeller (8)
| Devonte' Graham (10)
| Spectrum Center18,513
| 4–5
|- style="background:#fcc;"
| 10
| November 10
| @ Philadelphia
| 
| Cody Zeller (24)
| Cody Zeller (8)
| Devonte' Graham (10)
| Wells Fargo Center20,311
| 4–6
|- style="background:#fcc;"
| 11
| November 13
| Memphis
| 
| Terry Rozier (33)
| Zeller, Monk (8)
| Miles Bridges (7)
| Spectrum Center13,155
| 4–7
|- style="background:#cfc;"
| 12
| November 15
| Detroit
| 
| Rozier, Monk (19)
| Cody Zeller (7)
| Devonte' Graham (10)
| Spectrum Center16,778
| 5–7
|- style="background:#cfc;"
| 13
| November 16
| @ New York
| 
| Devonte' Graham (29)
| Nicolas Batum (9)
| Nicolas Batum (6)
| Madison Square Garden19,401
| 6–7
|- style="background:#fcc;"
| 14
| November 18
| @ Toronto
| 
| Marvin Williams (14)
| Nicolas Batum (6)
| Devonte' Graham (6)
| Scotiabank Arena19,800
| 6–8
|- style="background:#fcc;"
| 15
| November 20
| @ Brooklyn
| 
| Terry Rozier (18)
| Zeller, Biyombo (7)
| Devonte' Graham (6)
| Barclays Center14,011
| 6–9
|- style="background:#fcc;"
| 16
| November 22
| @ Washington
| 
| Miles Bridges (31)
| Miles Bridges (8)
| Batum, Graham (7)
| Capital One Arena15,053
| 6–10
|- style="background:#fcc;"
| 17
| November 23
| Chicago
| 
| Terry Rozier (28)
| Bismack Biyombo (12)
| Devonte' Graham (10)
| Spectrum Center17,891
| 6–11
|- style="background:#fcc;"
| 18
| November 25
| @ Miami
| 
| Terry Rozier (19)
| Terry Rozier (9)
| Devonte' Graham (8)
| American Airlines Arena19,600
| 6–12
|- style="background:#cfc;"
| 19
| November 27
| Detroit
| 
| Bismack Biyombo (19)
| Bismack Biyombo (9)
| Devonte' Graham (15)
| Spectrum Center15,535
| 7–12
|- style="background:#cfc;"
| 20
| November 29
| @ Detroit
| 
| P. J. Washington (26)
| Bismack Biyombo (9)
| Devonte' Graham (8)
| Little Caesars Arena15,006
| 8–12
|- style="background:#fcc;"
| 21
| November 30
| @ Milwaukee
| 
| Devonte' Graham (24)
| Willy Hernangomez (9)
| Devonte' Graham (5)
| Fiserv Forum17,550
| 8–13

|- style="background:#fcc;"
| 22
| December 2
| Phoenix
| 
| Marvin Williams (22)
| Bismack Biyombo (11)
| Devonte' Graham (13)
| Spectrum Center11,221
| 8–14
|- style="background:#cfc;"
| 23
| December 4
| Golden State
| 
| Devonte' Graham (33)
| Rozier, Graham (7)
| Devonte' Graham (9)
| Spectrum Center14,355
| 9–14
|- style="background:#fcc;"
| 24
| December 6
| Brooklyn
| 
| Devonte' Graham (29)
| Rozier, Zeller (6)
| Devonte' Graham (8)
| Spectrum Center15,075
| 9–15
|- style="background:#fcc;"
| 25
| December 8
| Atlanta
| 
| Washington, Bridges (20)
| P. J. Washington (8)
| Devonte' Graham (8)
| Spectrum Center15,489
| 9–16
|- style="background:#cfc;"
| 26
| December 10
| Washington
| 
| Devonte' Graham (29)
| Bismack Biyombo (15)
| Terry Rozier (7)
| Spectrum Center10,626
| 10–16
|- style="background:#cfc;"
| 27
| December 11
| @ Brooklyn
| 
| Devonte' Graham (40)
| Kidd-Gilchrist, Rozier (7)
| Devonte' Graham (5)
| Barclays Center15,631
| 11–16
|- style="background:#cfc;"
| 28
| December 13
| @ Chicago
| 
| Devonte' Graham (16)
| Washington, Zeller (10)
| Devonte' Graham (7)
| United Center18,377
| 12–16
|- style="background:#fcc;"
| 29
| December 15
| @ Indiana
| 
| Cody Zeller (19)
| Bismack Biyombo (17)
| Devonte' Graham (4)
| Bankers Life Fieldhouse16,061
| 12–17
|- style="background:#cfc;"
| 30
| December 17
| Sacramento
| 
| Malik Monk (23)
| Bismack Biyombo (12)
| Devonte' Graham (7)
| Spectrum Center13,229
| 13–17
|- style="background:#fcc;"
| 31
| December 18
| @ Cleveland
| 
| Terry Rozier (35)
| Cody Zeller (9)
| Devonte' Graham (9)
| Rocket Mortgage FieldHouse17,023
| 13–18
|- style="background:#fcc;"
| 32
| December 21
| Utah
| 
| Terry Rozier (29)
| Cody Zeller (8)
| Devonte' Graham (4)
| Spectrum Center16,187
| 13–19
|- style="background:#fcc;"
| 33
| December 22
| @ Boston
| 
| Devonte' Graham (23)
| Miles Bridges (6)
| Devonte' Graham (10)
| TD Garden19,156
| 13–20
|- style="background:#fcc;"
| 34
| December 27
| Oklahoma City
| 
| Terry Rozier (26)
| Bismack Biyombo (10)
| Devonte' Graham (13)
| Spectrum Center18,418
| 13–21
|- style="background:#fcc;"
| 35
| December 29
| @ Memphis
| 
| Malik Monk (18)
| Miles Bridges (7)
| Devonte' Graham (10)
| FedExForum16,842
| 13–22
|- style="background:#fcc;"
| 36
| December 31
| Boston
| 
| P. J. Washington (15)
| Miles Bridges (10)
| Devonte' Graham (7)
| Spectrum Center19,216
| 13–23

|- style="background:#cfc;"
| 37
| January 2
| @ Cleveland
| 
| Terry Rozier (30)
| Cody Zeller (7)
| Devonte' Graham (11)
| Rocket Mortgage FieldHouse17,859
| 14–23
|- style="background:#cfc;"
| 38
| January 4
| @ Dallas
| 
| Terry Rozier (27)
| Bismack Biyombo (13)
| Devonte' Graham (13)
| American Airlines Center20,327
| 15–23
|- style="background:#fcc;"
| 39
| January 6
| Indiana
| 
| Terry Rozier (28)
| P. J. Washington (9)
| Rozier, Graham (6)
| Spectrum Center13,009
| 15–24
|- style="background:#fcc;"
| 40
| January 8
| Toronto
| 
| Terry Rozier (27)
| P. J. Washington (12)
| Malik Monk (7)
| Spectrum Center13,965
| 15–25
|- style="background:#fcc;"
| 41
| January 10
| @ Utah
| 
| Terry Rozier (23)
| Bismack Biyombo (9)
| Devonte' Graham (5)
| Vivint Smart Home Arena18,306
| 15–26
|- style="background:#fcc;"
| 42
| January 12
| @ Phoenix
| 
| Dwayne Bacon (24)
| Cody Zeller (8)
| Devonte' Graham (8)
| Talking Stick Resort Arena14,751
| 15–27
|- style="background:#fcc;"
| 43
| January 13
| @ Portland
| 
| Devonte' Graham (27)
| P. J. Washington (11)
| Devonte' Graham (10)
| Moda Center19,111
| 15–28
|- style="background:#fcc;"
| 44
| January 15
| @ Denver
| 
| Terry Rozier (20)
| Miles Bridges (8)
| Terry Rozier (9)
| Pepsi Center19,520
| 15–29
|- style="background:#fcc;"
| 45
| January 20
| Orlando
| 
| Malik Monk (20)
| Cody Zeller (9)
| Devonte' Graham (6)
| Spectrum Center16,133
| 15–30
|- style="background:#fcc;"
| 46
| January 24
| Milwaukee
| 
| Malik Monk (31)
| Devonte' Graham (7)
| Batum, Monk, Rozier (5)
| AccorHotels Arena15,758
| 15–31
|- style="background:#cfc;"
| 47
| January 28
| New York
| 
| Terry Rozier (30)
| Hernangómez, Rozier, Zeller (10)
| Devonte' Graham (10)
| Spectrum Center14,342
| 16–31
|- style="background:#fcc;"
| 48
| January 30
| @ Washington
| 
| Miles Bridges (23)
| Rozier, Zeller (7)
| Devonte' Graham (8)
| Capital One Arena15,013
| 16–32

|- style="background:#fcc;"
| 49
| February 1
| @ San Antonio
| 
| Miles Bridges (25)
| Cody Zeller (12)
| Devonte' Graham (9)
| AT&T Center18,615
| 16–33
|- style="background:#fcc;"
| 50
| February 3
| Orlando
| 
| Terry Rozier (18)
| Bridges, Martin (8)
| Devonte' Graham (5)
| Spectrum Center12,337
| 16–34
|- style="background:#fcc;"
| 51
| February 4
| @ Houston
| 
| Bridges, Rozier (20)
| Miles Bridges (15)
| Devonte' Graham (10)
| Toyota Center18,055
| 16–35
|- style="background:#fcc;"
| 52
| February 8
| Dallas
| 
| Devonte' Graham (26)
| P. J. Washington (9)
| Devonte' Graham (10)
| Spectrum Center19,370
| 16–36
|- style="background:#cfc;"
| 53
| February 10
| @ Detroit
| 
| Miles Bridges (18)
| Cody Zeller (10)
| Devonte' Graham (11)
| Little Caesars Arena13,941
| 17–36
|- style="background:#cfc;"
| 54
| February 12
| @ Minnesota
| 
| Devonte' Graham (28)
| Bismack Biyombo (10)
| Devonte' Graham (8)
| Target Center18,978
| 18–36
|- style="background:#cfc;"
| 55
| February 20
| @ Chicago
| 
| Malik Monk (25)
| Bridges, Zeller (8)
| Devonte' Graham (7)
| United Center17,463
| 19–36
|- style="background:#fcc;"
| 56
| February 22
| Brooklyn
| 
| P. J. Washington (16)
| McDaniels, Zeller (9)
| Miles Bridges (5)
| Spectrum Center19,079
| 19–37
|- style="background:#fcc;"
| 57
| February 25
| @ Indiana
| 
| Miles Bridges (17)
| Bridges, Martin (6)
| Terry Rozier (7)
| Bankers Life Fieldhouse16,088
| 19–38
|- style="background:#cfc;"
| 58
| February 26
| New York
| 
| Terry Rozier (26)
| Caleb Martin (9)
| Devonte' Graham (5)
| Spectrum Center13,152
| 20–38
|- style="background:#cfc;"
| 59
| February 28
| @ Toronto
| 
| Graham, Rozier (18)
| Bismack Biyombo (11)
| Martin, Rozier (6)
| Scotiabank Arena19,800
| 21–38

|- style="background:#fcc;"
| 60
| March 1
| Milwaukee
| 
| Devonte' Graham (17)
| Willy Hernangómez (13)
| Hernangómez, Rozier (4)
| Spectrum Center19,149
| 21–39
|- style="background:#fcc;"
| 61
| March 3
| San Antonio
| 
| Terry Rozier (20)
| Jalen McDaniels (9)
| McDaniels, Rozier (5)
| Spectrum Center12,008
| 21–40
|- style="background:#fcc;"
| 62
| March 5
| Denver
| 
| Devonte' Graham (24)
| Miles Bridges (9)
| Graham, Martin (7)
| Spectrum Center13,311
| 21–41
|- style="background:#cfc;"
| 63
| March 7
| Houston
| 
| Terry Rozier (24)
| Willy Hernangómez (11)
| Cody Martin (9)
| Spectrum Center19,159
| 22–41
|- style="background:#fcc;"
| 64
| March 9
| @ Atlanta
| 
| Terry Rozier (40)
| Cody Zeller (7)
| Devonte' Graham (10)
| State Farm Arena14,399
| 22–42
|- style="background:#cfc;"
| 65
| March 11
| @ Miami
| 
| Devonte' Graham (30)
| Cody Zeller (11)
| Devonte' Graham (6)
| American Airlines Arena19,600
| 23–42

|- style="background:#;"
| 66
| March 13
| Cleveland
| 
|
|
|
| Spectrum Center
|
|- style="background:#;"
| 67
| March 15
| @ Orlando
| 
|
|
|
| Amway Center
|
|- style="background:#;"
| 68
| March 17
| @ New York
| 
|
|
|
| Madison Square Garden
|
|- style="background:#;"
| 69
| March 19
| Philadelphia
| 
|
|
|
| Spectrum Center
|
|- style="background:#;"
| 70
| March 21
| LA Lakers
| 
|
|
|
| Spectrum Center
|
|- style="background:#;"
| 71
| March 24
| Portland
| 
|
|
|
| Spectrum Center
|
|- style="background:#;"
| 72
| March 26
| @ Oklahoma City
| 
|
|
|
| Chesapeake Energy Arena
|
|- style="background:#;"
| 73
| March 28
| LA Clippers
| 
|
|
|
| Spectrum Center
|
|- style="background:#;"
| 74
| March 30
| Miami
| 
|
|
|
| Spectrum Center
|
|- style="background:#;"
| 75
| April 1
| @ Orlando
| 
|
|
|
| Amway Center
|
|- style="background:#;"
| 76
| April 3
| @ Atlanta
| 
|
|
|
| State Farm Arena
|
|- style="background:#;"
| 77
| April 5
| Atlanta
| 
|
|
|
| Spectrum Center
|
|- style="background:#;"
| 78
| April 7
| @ New Orleans
| 
|
|
|
| Smoothie King Center
|
|- style="background:#;"
| 79
| April 8
| Toronto
| 
|
|
|
| Spectrum Center
|
|- style="background:#;"
| 80
| April 11
| Washington
| 
|
|
|
| Spectrum Center
|
|- style="background:#;"
| 81
| April 13
| Miami
| 
|
|
|
| Spectrum Center
|
|- style="background:#;"
| 82
| April 15
| @ Philadelphia
| 
|
|
|
| Wells Fargo Center
|

Player statistics

|-
| align="left"| || align="center"| SG
|  ||  ||  ||  ||  ||  ||  ||
|-
| align="left"| || align="center"| SF
|  ||  ||  ||  ||  ||  ||  ||
|-
| align="left"| || align="center"| C
|  ||  ||  ||  ||  ||  ||  ||
|-
| align="left"| || align="center"| SF
|  ||  ||  ||  ||  ||  ||  ||
|-
| align="left"| || align="center"| PG
|  ||  ||  ||  ||  ||  ||  ||
|-
| align="left"| || align="center"| PG
|  ||  ||  ||  ||  ||  ||  ||
|-
| align="left"| || align="center"| C
|  ||  ||  ||  ||  ||  ||  ||
|-
| align="left"| || align="center"| PF
|  ||  ||  ||  ||  ||  ||  ||
|-
| align="left"| || align="center"| SF
|  ||  ||  ||  ||  ||  ||  ||
|-
| align="left"| || align="center"| SF
|  ||  ||  ||  ||  ||  ||  ||
|-
| align="left"| || align="center"| PF
|  ||  ||  ||  ||  ||  ||  ||
|-
| align="left"| || align="center"| SG
|  ||  ||  ||  ||  ||  ||  ||
|-
| align="left"| || align="center"| PG
|  ||  ||  ||  ||  ||  ||  ||
|-
| align="left"| || align="center"| PF
|  || ||  || ||  ||  || ||
|-
| align="left"| || align="center"| PF
|  ||  ||  ||  ||  ||  ||  ||
|-
| align="left"| || align="center"| C
|  ||  ||  ||  ||  ||  ||  ||
|}
After all games.

Transactions

Trades

Free agents

Additions

Waivings

Notes
  Contract was later converted into a two-way contract.
  Contract was later converted into a multi-year contract.
  Signed to a 10-day contract.
  Signed to a second 10-day contract.

References

Charlotte Hornets seasons
Charlotte Hornets
Charlotte Hornets